DCL3 (an abbreviation of Dicer-like 3) is a gene in plants that codes for the DCL3 protein, a ribonuclease III enzyme involved in plants specific pathway RNA-directed DNA methylation. Where DCL3 cleaves endogenous double-stranded RNAs into 24 nucleotide small interfering RNAs. The main difference to other DCLs is the dsRNA source, which precursor for DCL3 is generally transcribed in heterochromatic regions by the RNA polymerase complex, RNA polymerase IV, producing single-stranded RNA roughly of 30 to 45 nucleotides in length,  which are converted into dsRNA by RNA-dependent RNA polymerase 2. Once cleaved by DCL3, the 24-nt siRNA strand is loaded into AGO4, which interacts with Pol V–transcribed long noncoding RNAs and recruits domains-rearranged methylase 2, facilitating DNA methylation.

References 

Ribonucleases
Plant genes